JS Kokuryū (SS-506) is the sixth boat of Sōryū-class submarines. She was commissioned on 9 March 2015.

Construction and career
Kokuryū was laid down at Kawasaki Heavy Industries Kobe Shipyard on January 21, 2011, as the 2010 plan 2900-ton submarine No. 8121 based on the medium-term defense capability development plan. At the launching ceremony, it was named Kokuryū and launched on 31 October 2013. She's commissioned on 9 March 2015 and deployed to Yokosuka.

Kokuryū homeport is Yokosuka.

Gallery

Citations

External links

2013 ships
Sōryū-class submarines
Ships built by Kawasaki Heavy Industries